is a 1958 Japanese period film directed by Keisuke Kinoshita and based on the 1956 novella of the same name by Shichirō Fukazawa. The film explores the legendary practice of ubasute, in which elderly people were carried to a mountain and abandoned to die.

Cast
 Kinuyo Tanaka as Orin
 Teiji Takahashi as Tatsuhei
 Yūko Mochizuki as Tamayan
 Danko Ichikawa as Kesakichi
 Keiko Ogasawara as Matsu-yan
 Seiji Miyaguchi as Matayan
 Yūnosuke Itō as Matayan's son
 Ken Mitsuda as Teruyan

Reception
The film featured in competition at the 19th Venice International Film Festival and divided critics between those who thought it a masterpiece and those who thought it poor.

The film won three Mainichi Film Awards, including Best Film; it was submitted as the Japanese entry for the Best Foreign Language Film at the 31st Academy Awards, but was not chosen as one of the five nominees.

In a June 1961 review in The New York Times, A.H. Weiler called the film "an odd and colorful evocation of Japan's past that is only occasionally striking"; "It is stylized and occasionally graphic fare in the manner of the Kabuki Theatre, which is realistically staged, but decidedly strange to Western tastes."

Roger Ebert of the Chicago Sun-Times rated the film a maximum 4 stars, and added it to his Great Movies list in 2013, making it the final film he added to the list before his death.

Restoration
During the 2012 Cannes Film Festival, a digitally restored version of the film was screened out of competition, as part of the festival's Cannes Classics selections.

In a 2013 review of The Criterion Collection release of the Blu-ray Disc version of the restored film, Slant Magazine's Jordan Cronk said Kinoshita, a "less celebrated" practitioner in the jidaigeki genre,
"takes one of Japan's most chronicled cultural tools, Kabuki theater, as a stylistic blueprint to interpret both a work of literary renown and a legend of ancestral import. And yet for all its solemn reverence (both spiritually and socially), it's one of the era's most radical experiments. Shot exclusively on soundstages, save for one brief final scene, the film consolidates two distinct mediums, theater and cinema, into an analysis of both aesthetic functionality and affinity. By not masking his chosen conceptual conceit (and indeed, by heightening it), Kinoshita is free to explore the formulations and possibilities of both modes of presentation. 
Cronk concludes "Kinoshita respects the source material and conventions of the culture he's depicting so much, ...that the film plays more like a cinematic elegy than cosmetic theater. When the film cuts in its final scene to actual location footage, it isn't jarring so much as relieving, a chance to exhale after an exhausting journey."

See also
The Ballad of Narayama (1983 film).

References

External links
 
 
 
 
The Ballad of Narayama: Abandonment an essay by Philip Kemp at the Criterion Collection

Films directed by Keisuke Kinoshita
Jidaigeki films
Shochiku films
1950s Japanese-language films
Best Film Kinema Junpo Award winners
1958 films
1958 drama films
Films with screenplays by Keisuke Kinoshita
1950s Japanese films